The Ness Award is an annual award of the Royal Geographical Society to travellers, particularly those who have successfully popularised Geography and the wider understanding of our world and its environments. It was established in 1953 and named after Mrs Patrick Ness (1881–1962), an intrepid and well-to-do traveller throughout Africa and the first female Fellow of the Society.

Mrs Patrick Ness was born Elizabeth Wilhelmina Miller in Brighton in 1881 and married Patrick Powell Ness in 1903. She accompanied her husband to Kenya before the First World War and then returned alone in 1920, when she made several epic journeys across the African and Asian continents. In 1923 she crossed the Syrian Desert, in 1927 she travelled from Khartoum to Nairobi and on via the Congo to the Cape, the first European woman to travel on Lake Kivu. She later wrote a book of her adventures entitled Ten Thousand Miles in Two Continents

Recipients
Source: RGS

See also
List of geographers
List of geography awards
List of prizes named after people

References

External links
 List of links to RGS awards winners

Awards of Royal Geographical Society
Awards established in 1953